Tyquan Thornton (born August 7, 2000) is an American football wide receiver for the New England Patriots of the National Football League (NFL). He played college football at Baylor and was drafted by the Patriots in the second round of the 2022 NFL Draft.

Early career
Thornton attended Booker T. Washington Senior High School in Miami, Florida.

College career

Thornton originally committed to the University of Florida to play college football before flipping his commitment to Baylor University.

Thornton attended Baylor from 2018 to 2022. During his career he had 143 receptions for 2,242 yards and 19 touchdowns.

College statistics

Professional career
At the 2022 NFL Combine, Thornton ran an unofficial 4.21 in the 40-yard dash which would’ve been an NFL combine record, but it was ruled that he ran a 4.28, the third fastest in the 2022 combine.

Thornton was selected by the New England Patriots in the second round (50th overall) of the 2022 NFL Draft.

2022 season 
On September 1, 2022, Thornton was placed on injured reserve after suffering a fractured clavicle in the preseason. He was activated on October 8, 2022. In Week 6 against the Cleveland Browns, Thornton scored his first receiving and rushing touchdowns, making him the first Patriots wide receiver since Deion Branch to score a receiving and rushing touchdown in the same game. Thornton finished his rookie season with 22 catches for 247 yards and two touchdowns. He also ran 3 times for 16 yards and a touchdown.

References

External links
 New England Patriots bio
Baylor Bears bio

2000 births
Living people
American football wide receivers
Baylor Bears football players
New England Patriots players
Players of American football from Miami